Pleuni Möhlmann (born 25 May 1984) is a road cyclist from Netherlands.

As a novice she became Dutch National Champion in the road race in 1999. As a junior, she won the silver medal at the 2001 UCI Road World Championships in the junior women's road race. In 2002, she won the bronze medal in the junior category at the Dutch National Road Race Championships.

References

External links
 profile at cyclingarchives.com

1984 births
Living people
Dutch female cyclists
Sportspeople from Apeldoorn
Cyclists from Gelderland
20th-century Dutch women
21st-century Dutch women